Aleksandr Sergeyevich Sapeta (born 28 June 1989) is a Russian footballer who plays as central midfielder.

Club career
He has been playing in the Saturn system throughout his youth years. He made his debut for the main Saturn team on 26 October 2008 when he was a starter in the Premier League match against FC Moscow.

In winter 2011 Sapeta was signed by FC Dynamo Moscow.

On 9 August 2012, he came off the bench to score a brace in a 5-0 win against Dundee United in the second leg of their third qualifying round tie in the 2012–13 UEFA Europa League.

On 22 February 2018, he signed a 2-year contract with FC Rostov. He was released from his Rostov contract by mutual consent on 21 August 2018.

On 27 January 2022, he joined FC Kuban Krasnodar on loan.

International career
Sapeta was one of the members of the Russian U-17 squad that won the 2006 UEFA U-17 Championship.

Career statistics

References

External links
 
 
 
  Player page on the official FC Saturn Moscow oblast site

1989 births
People from Engels, Saratov Oblast
Sportspeople from Saratov Oblast
Living people
Russian footballers
Russia youth international footballers
Russia under-21 international footballers
Russia national football B team footballers
Association football midfielders
FC Saturn Ramenskoye players
FC Dynamo Moscow players
FC Ural Yekaterinburg players
FC Rostov players
FC Nizhny Novgorod (2015) players
FC Urozhay Krasnodar players
FC Volga Ulyanovsk players
Russian Premier League players
Russian First League players